Saint James Court is a historic apartment complex located at Indianapolis, Indiana.  It was built in 1919, and consists of two -story, Renaissance Revival style buildings.  The buildings are faced in thick stucco and feature terra cotta panels with bas relief decoration.

It was listed on the National Register of Historic Places in 1987.

References

Apartment buildings in Indiana
Residential buildings on the National Register of Historic Places in Indiana
Renaissance Revival architecture in Indiana
Residential buildings completed in 1919
Residential buildings in Indianapolis
National Register of Historic Places in Indianapolis